Showcase Workshop, also referred to as Showcase, is a SaaS company that develops a presentation-building application for business use. Users upload files and images to a web platform which generates presentations viewable on a suite of mobile apps.

Showcase was founded in 2011. The company’s headquarters are in Wellington, New Zealand.

History 
Showcase Workshop was originally developed in response to dynamically changing content being presented on iPads at the 2012 Olympics.

After market-testing a beta version of the core application, Showcase Workshop launched commercially in 2012.

In 2014 Showcase partnered with Vodafone Global Enterprise.

Product 
Users upload pre-existing PDFs, videos, images and Microsoft Office documents to a secure server, building presentations or ‘showcases’ which can then be downloaded via the mobile apps. The presentations are used for mobile sales enablement, training, or operational/health and safety purposes.

Reception 
Reviewers have praised the ease of use of Showcase, calling it a “better alternative to developing a native app” and “intuitive”.

Criticisms include the lack of differing templates and a lack of complex customisation controls.

Showcase was nominated for a Tabby Award in 2014 and won a Tabby Award in 2015 for its Windows app.

See also 
 Prezi
 PowerPoint

References

External links 
  – official site

Web software
Web applications
Rich web applications
Cloud applications
Presentation software
Software companies of New Zealand